McKeever and the Colonel is an American sitcom that was broadcast on NBC from September 23, 1962 to June 16, 1963 on Sunday nights at 6:30 P.M. Eastern Time. Its setting was a fictional military academy known as Westfield. Dick Powell's Four Star Television produced the series.

Synopsis

Gary McKeever (played by Scott Lane) was the lead character, a likable but mischievous cadet. He often found himself in trouble with the camp commandant, the pompous Colonel Harvey T. Blackwell (played by character actor Allyn Joslyn). Jackie Coogan played Sgt. Barnes, a down-to-earth school staffer who was more sympathetic to McKeever. The program also starred Elisabeth Fraser as the school nurse Miss Warner, character actor John McGiver as well as child actor John Eimen as Monk.

Other media

Dell Comics published three issues of a McKeever and the Colonel comic book.

Milton Bradley came out with a Bamboozle board game based on the series.

Halco Toys, a division of the J. Halpern Company issued a tie-in set containing a belt with canteen, toy automatic pistol, holster and hand grenade.

Episode list

References

External links

1960s American sitcoms
1962 American television series debuts
1963 American television series endings
Black-and-white American television shows
Military comedy television series
NBC original programming
Television series by Four Star Television
Television series by 20th Century Fox Television
Military academies in fiction